A Spectre Is Haunting Europe was a progressive deathrock band from Vancouver, British Columbia.

History
A Spectre Is Haunting Europe was formed in 2002, during the height of Vancouver's post-punk revival, and was initially billed as Decora. The band's activity was intermittent for the first two years. The name refers to the first sentence of The Communist Manifesto (1848).

It was not until 2004 that the band found a niche with its brand of politicized post-punk and subsequently changed its name to A Spectre Is Haunting Europe. Their first album, Astonishing Tales of the Sea, was released that year. Through a succession of different drummers, the band stretched this material in a few different directions at once, culminating in a caustic 2004 appearance at the Drop Dead Festival in New York City. In early 2006, Phil Western joined the group as drummer.

With their 2006 album, Flames, the band broadened its appeal to include a more general indie rock audience. Its recordings have been reviewed in music media.

In 2008, the band released its third album, Embers, as a creative commons free digital release.

Discography

Albums
 Astonishing Tales of the Sea (Simulacre) – 2004
 Flames (Simulacre) – 2006
 Embers (Simulacre) – 2008

Singles
 "Servers/Stop" (split 12" single with Entertainme.nt) (Simulacre/aDistant) – 2006

Compilations
 "New Dark Age 4" (Strobelight Records) – 2006
 "Smoke and Spotlight" (X-Pop Society) – 2006

References

External links
A Spectre Is Haunting Europe official website
A Spectre Is Haunting Europe profile on CBC Radio 3
Simulacre Media record label
Strobelight Records
Scratch Distribution

Musical groups from Vancouver
Musical groups established in 2003
Death rock groups
Canadian goth groups
Canadian indie rock groups
2003 establishments in British Columbia